The environment of North Korea comprises the diverse ecosystems of the part of the Korean peninsula controlled by the Democratic People's Republic of Korea. This includes alpine, forest, farmland, freshwater, and marine ecosystems. 

Since the 1980s, the environment has been reported to be in a state of "crisis", "catastrophe", or "collapse". Pollution and deforestation are key problems. However, this has been contested by some accounts. In addition, North Korea has some environmental programs to mitigate the problems.

Overview
More than 80 percent of North Korea is mountainous with cultivation largely confined to coastal strips in the east and west.  According to a United Nations Environmental Programme report in 2003, forest covers over 70 percent of the country, mostly on steep slopes. However, other studies have suggested that, due to deforestation, forest cover was only about 50%. There are nine rivers and numerous smaller waterways. The environment is correspondingly diverse, consisting of alpine, forest, farmland, freshwater, and marine ecosystems.

Due to its geological history, the country has a range of vegetation, from the subtropical, temperate and frigid zones, which are able to coexist due to the combined effects of oceanic and continental climates.  The climate has pronounced seasonal variations, with warm summers and snowfall in winter.

Biodiversity

In 2003, animal and plant species in North Korea were reported to be "profuse".  Four percent of the higher plant species were reported to be endangered, vulnerable, rare, or in decline.  Eleven percent of vertebrate species were reported to be critically endangered, endangered, or rare.

In 2013 a delegation of visiting scientists reported major environmental devastation. They described an absence of wildlife and said that the "landscape is basically dead". This situation was described as "so severe it could destabilize the whole country".

However, a group of birdwatchers from the Pukorokoro Miranda Naturalists' Trust, New Zealand, visited the Yellow Sea shore of Mundŏk County in South P'yŏngan province in 2016 and reported that the mudflats there were a haven for bird life. The relative lack of development there compared to nearby China and South Korea had provided a refuge for several internationally important birds on their migration along the East Asian-Australasian Flyway - such as the critically endangered Eastern curlew, the Eurasian curlew and the bar-tailed godwit.

Flora 

The flora of North Korea has much in common with that of other areas of the northern hemisphere. 2898 species have been recorded, of which 14% are endemic. Four are classified as threatened.

The native plant communities in the lowlands have largely disappeared with cultivation and urbanisation. Native conifer forest communities are located in the highlands. The forest types are mainly subarctic (boreal) and cool-temperate forest.

Environmental problems

Pollution

In 2003, air pollution in Pyongyang, largely due to combustion of coal, was reported to be unacceptable.  This is somewhat mitigated by the high use of public transport in urban areas.

In 2003, the pollution of rivers and streams was reported to be "severe" due to a decrease in investment in environmental protection and the improper discharge of untreated sewage and industrial effluent. The quality of the Taedong River, which flows through Pyongyang, was reported to be "deteoriating", exacerbated by the construction of the West Sea Barrage. A survey conducted in 2017 found that 93% of sanitation facilities were not connected to a sewage system. Rather, the human waste was used as fertilizer on fields, creating the potential health risk of spreading intestinal worms.

North Korea produces large quantities of DDT and other pesticides.

Deforestation

Cultivation, logging, and natural disasters have all put pressure on North Korea's forests. During the economic crisis of the 1990s, deforestation accelerated, as people turned to the woodlands to provide firewood and food.  This in turn has led to soil erosion, soil depletion, and increased risk of flooding.

Based on satellite imagery in 2013, it has been estimated that 40 percent of forest cover has been lost since 1985.  The United Nations Environmental Programme in 2003 reported a much smaller rate of depletion.

A forest restoration policy has been in place since 2012, especially on hillsides around Pyongyang and in South Pyongan Province. However deforestation appears to continue in remote areas. New crop cultivation of slopes exceeding 15 degrees has been banned to help prevent erosion and landslides.

In 2018, North Korea had a Forest Landscape Integrity Index mean score of 8.02/10, ranking it 28th globally out of 172 countries. Satellite analysis of North Korean land in 2019 indicated forests accounted for 45%, farmland for 27% and grasslands for 13%.

In recent years, forest cover has been growing at 0.2% every year up to 45% in 2019, with forests reemerging especially around Pyongyang, although in some rural areas, deforestation has still occurred, due to wood being an easy source of fuel in the countryside.

Environmental programs

In response to the deforestation problem, North Korea has implemented a tree planting program. In 2016, the Korean Central News Agency reported that the Central Nursery under the Ministry of Land and Environment Protection had produced 90 million saplings over the past five years for distribution around the country. Official pronouncements have labeled illegal forest destruction as "treachery" and threatened perpetrators with the death penalty. In 2017, Kim Il-sung University announced the opening of a new Forest Science Department. In 2018, North Korea made an agreement with the South on forestry co-operation.

The North Korean government has ratified the Kyoto Protocol on global warming and has been co-operating with international efforts to combat climate change. It has invested in the development of solar and other renewable energy technology. In 2017, the Foreign Ministry condemned the US government for withdrawing from the Paris Agreement.

North Korea has participated in international environmental projects, such as the conservation of the red-crowned crane. In 2017, Pyongyang hosted a workshop on the conservation of wetlands and migratory waterbirds, attended by the International Union for Conservation of Nature, the Hanns Seidel Foundation, and the East Asian Australasian Flyway Partnership.

While recycling of materials in North Korea has always been a practice, a new law in 2020 gave it a much higher profile and required organizations to recycle. A national recycling plan stipulated the minimum recycling quantity for certain materials, and placed requirements at the province, county and city levels. Economic reasons are a strong driver of this effort, reducing some imports.

Gallery

See also
 Geography of North Korea
 Climate change in North Korea

References

External links

 
North Korea
Environmental issues in North Korea